A Government purpose reserve is a type of New Zealand protected area. There are currently 215 recognised government purpose reserves in New Zealand.

Some of these reserves are important wetlands. Others are small pockets of land around lighthouses.

North Island

Northland Region

 Awakino Government Purpose Wildlife Management Reserve
 Coates Memorial Church Reserve
 Hewlett Point Sand Islands Government Purpose Reserve
 Lake Taeore Wildlife Management Reserve
 Manganui River Government Purpose Wildlife Management Reserve
 Mangawhai Government Purpose Wildlife Refuge Reserve
 Mangonuiowae Government Purpose Wildlife Management Reserve
 Marsden Spit Government Purpose Wildlife Management Reserve
 Matapouri Estuary Government Purpose Wildlife Management Reserve
 Ngunguru Government Purpose Wildlife Management Reserve
 Omamari Government Purpose Wildlife Management Reserve
 Omatai Government Purpose Wildlife Management Reserve
 Opuawhanga Government Purpose Wildlife Refuge Reserve
 Otaika Valley Government Purpose Wildlife Management Reserve
 Otakairangi Swamp Government Purpose Wildlife Management Reserve
 Paerata Government Purpose Wildlife Refuge Reserve
 Paranui Stream Government Purpose Wildlife Management Reserve
 Punahaere Government Purpose Wildlife Management Reserve
 Takahoa Government Purpose Wildlife Management Reserve
 Waipu Government Purpose Wildlife Refuge Reserve
 Wairua River (Government Purpose) Wildlife Management Reserve

Auckland Region

 Manukapua Government Purpose (Wildlife Management) Reserve
 Medlands Wildlife Management Reserve
 Oruawharo Creek Government Purpose Reserve
 Takahoa Government Purpose Wildlife Management Reserve
 Tapora Government Purpose (Wildlife Management)

Waikato Region

 Awaroa Swamp Wildlife Management Reserve
 Cowan Wildlife Refuge
 Flax Block Wildlife Management Reserve
 Hurrells Lake Wildlife Refuge Reserve
 Islands in the Waikato River Wildlife Management Reserve
 Kapenga Wildlife Management Reserve
 Kopuatai Wetland Management Reserve
 Lake Hakanoa Wildlife Refuge Reserve
 Lake Kimihia Wildlife Management Reserve
 Lake Kopuera Wildlife Refuge
 Lake Koromatua Wildlife Management Reserve
 Lake Ngapouri Wildlife Management Reserve
 Lake Ngarotoiti Wildlife Management Reserve
 Lake Okowhao Wildlife Management Reserve
 Lake Orotu Wildlife Management Reserve
 Lake Rotomanuka Wildlife Management Reserve
 Lake Rotongaro Wildlife Management Reserve
 Lake Rotopotaka Wildlife Management Reserve
 Lake Ruatuna Wildlife Management Reserve
 Lake Serpentine Wildlife Management Reserve
 Lake Tutaeinanga Wildlife Management Reserve
 Lake Waahi Wildlife Management Reserve
 Lake Waikare Wildlife Management Reserve
 Lake Whangape Wildlife Management Reserve
 Mapara Wildlife Management Reserve
 Matarangi Wildlife Habitat Reserve
 Matariki Wildlife Management Reserve
 Meyer Block Wildlife Refuge Reserve
 Miranda Taramaire Government Purpose Reserve Wildlife Management Area
 Opitonui River Mouth Wildlife Management Reserve
 Opuatia Swamp Wildlife Management Reserve
 Oruatua Reserve
 Patersons Lagoon Wildlife Management Reserve
 Patetonga Lake Wildlife Management Reserve
 Rotowaro Wildlife Management Reserve
 Takahoa Government Purpose Wildlife Management Reserve
 Te Mata Wildlife Management Reserve
 Torehape Wetland Management Reserve
 Waemaro Wildlife Management Reserve
 Waikite Wildlife Management Reserve
 Whangamarino Government Purpose Reserve
 Whangamarino Wetland Management Reserve

Bay of Plenty Region

 Athenree Wildlife Refuge Reserve
 Awaiti Wildlife Management Reserve
 Awakaponga Wildlife Management Reserve
 Bregman Wildlife Management Reserve
 Estuary Wildlife Management Reserve
 Fort Galatea Wildlife Management Reserve
 Jess Road Wildlife Management Reserve
 Karewa Island Wildlife Sanctuary
 Lake Tamurenui Government Purpose (Wildlife Management) Reserve
 Lower Kaituna Wildlife Management Reserve
 Maketu Wildlife Management Reserve
 Margaret Jackson Wildlife Management Reserve
 Matata Wildlife Refuge Reserve
 Matuku Wildlife Management Reserve
 Motunau (Plate) Island Wildlife Sanctuary
 Moutohora (Whale) Island Wildlife Management Reserve
 Ohope Spit Wildlife Refuge Reserve
 Okorero—Thornton Lagoon Wildlife Management Reserve
 Old Kaituna Riverbed Wildlife Management Reserve
 Orini Wildlife Management Reserve
 Piripai Wildlife Management Reserve
 Sulphur Point Wildlife Sanctuary Reserve
 Tarawera Cut Wildlife Management Reserve
 Thornton Lagoon Wildlife Management Reserve
 Whangakopikopiko (Wildlife Refuge) Reserve

Gisborne District

 East Island/Whangaokena Wildlife Management Reserve
 Mata Whero Wildlife Management Reserve
 Matawhero Wildlife Reserve Depot
 Te Puia Springs Reserve

Hawke's Bay Region

 Ngamotu Lagoon Wildlife Management Reserve
 Tutaekuri Climatic Reserve

Taranaki Region

 Ihupuku Swamp Wildlife Management Reserve
 Mahoe Growth and Preservation of Timber Reserve
 Mangahinau Esplanade Reserve
 Takahoa Government Purpose Wildlife Management Reserve

Manawatū-Whanganui Region

 Hautapu River Soil Conservation Reserve
 Lake Kohata Wildlife Management Reserve
 Makerua Swamp Wildlife Management Reserve
 Mount Bruce National Wildlife Centre Reserve
 Pitangi Reserve
 Pukaha / Mount Bruce National Wildlife Centre Reserve

Wellington Region

 Allsops Bay Wildlife Reserve
 Government House Reserve
 Horokiri Wildlife Management Reserve
 Lake Kohangatera Wildlife Reserve
 MacKays Crossing Wildlife Reserve
 Matthews & Boggy Pond Wildlife Reserve
 Pauatahanui Wildlife Reserve
 Ruamahanga Cutoff Wildlife Reserve
 Turners Lagoon Wildlife Reserve
 Turner Wildlife Reserve

South Island

Tasman District

 Neiman Creek Wildlife Reserve
 Westhaven (Whanganui Inlet) Wildlife Management Reserve

Marlborough District

 Para Swamp Wildlife Reserve
 Tory Channel Leading Lights Reserve
 Wairau Lagoons Wetland Management Reserve
 Waitaria Bay School Reserve

West Coast Region

 Back Creek Swamp Wildlife Management Reserve
 Buller River Quarantine Reserve
 Coal Creek Wildlife Management Reserve
 Gillows Dam Wildlife Management Reserve
 Kongahu Swamp Wildlife Management Reserve
 Lake Haupiri Wildlife Management Reserve
 Lake Ryan Wildlife Refuge Reserve
 Mumu Creek Wetland Wildlife Management Reserve
 Nile River Wharf Reserve
 Okarito Lagoon Wildlife Management Reserve
 Otumahana Reserve
 Paroa Wildlife Management Reserve
 Paynes Gully Wildlife Management Reserve
 Rotokino Wildlife Management Reserve
 Shearers Swamp Wildlife Management Reserve
 Totara Lagoon Wildlife Management Reserve
 White Heron Lagoon Wildlife Management Reserve

Canterbury Region

 Ben Omar Wetland Government Purpose Reserve
 Black Point Government Purpose Reserve Wildlife Management
 Cass River Delta Government Purpose Reserve Wildlife Management
 Coopers Lagoon Government Purpose Reserve Wildlife Management
 Corner Knob And Goldney Hill Government Purpose Reserve
 Coutts Island Wildlife Sanctuary
 Cruickshanks Pond Government Purpose Reserve Wildlife Management
 German Creek Wildlife Management Reserve
 Godley Head Farm Park Reserve
 Harts Creek Wildlife Management Reserve
 Hawdon Flats Government Purpose Reserve
 Kowai River Government Purpose Reserve
 Lake Clearwater Government Purpose Reserve
 Lake Emma Government Purpose Reserve
 Kowai River Government Purpose Reserve
 Lake Clearwater Government Purpose Reserve
 Lake Emma Government Purpose Reserve
 Lake Rotorua Wildlife Reserve - Government Purpose
 Lakeside Wildlife Management Reserve
 Morven Government Purpose Reserve General Government Buildings
 Motukarara Nursery Reserve
 Normanby Wetland Wildlife Management Reserve
 North Kowai River Government Purpose Reserve Railway Conservation
 Opihi River Government Purpose Reserve Railway Conservation
 Otukaikino Government Purpose Reserve Wildlife Management
 Otumatu Rocks Wildlife Reserve - Government Purpose
 Pohatu Government Purpose Reserve Wildlife Refuge
 Rakaia Riverbed Government Purpose Reserve Railway Purposes
 Selwyn Wildlife Management Reserve
 Waihao Box Government Purpose Reserve Wildlife Management
 Waitohi River Government Purpose Reserve Wildlife Management
 Wards Government Purpose Reserve Wildlife Management
 Washdyke Lagoon Government Purpose Reserve Wildlife Management
 Washdyke Lagoon Wildlife Refuge
 Williams Government Purpose Reserve Wildlife Management
 Yarrs Flat Wildlife Reserve

Otago Region

 Allans Beach Wildlife Management Reserve
 Allanton Wildlife Management Reserve
 Buckhams Brewery Site
 Butterfields Wildlife Management Area
 Camp Armstrong
 Canadian Flats Wildlife Management Reserve
 Cape Wanbrow Lighthouse Reserve
 Diamond Lake and Lake Reid Wildlife Management Reserve
 Eden Creek Wildlife Management Area
 Glendhu Wetland Government Purpose (Wildlife Management) Reserve
 Glenorchy Lagoon Wildlife Management Reserve
 Hall Road Wetlands
 Inch Clutha Wildlife Management Reserve
 Katiki Point Wildlife Management Reserve
 Kingston Railway/Foreshore Reserve
 Kinvara Track
 Lake Waihola-Gillanders Wildlife Management Reserve
 Lake Waihola Wildlife Management Reserve
 Lake Waipori Wildlife Management Reserve
 Little Hoopers Inlet Wildlife Management Reserve
 Matakitaki Wetland Reserve
 McKays Triangle Wildlife Management Reserve
 Merton Arm Wildlife Management Reserve
 Nugget Point Lighthouse Reserve
 Puerua Wildlife Management Reserve
 Sawmill Wildlife Management Area
 Serpentine Wildlife Management Reserve
 Shepherds Hut and Stony Creek Wildlife Management Reserve
 Taieri River Wildlife Management Reserve
 Tomahawk Lagoon Wildlife Management Reserve
 Tuckers Beach Wildlife Management Reserve
 Waipori/Waihola Wildlife Management Reserve

Southland Region

 Dipton Bush Reserve
 Dog Island Lighthouse Government Purpose Reserve
 Drummond Swamp Wildlife Management Reserve
 Home Creek Wildlife Management Reserve
 Kakapo Swamp Wildlife Management Reserve
 Lake George Wildlife Management Reserve
 Makarewa Wildlife Lagoon Wildlife Management Reserve
 Orepuki Wildlife Reserve
 Rabbit Island Quarantine Reserve
 Snowdon Lagoon Wildlife Management Reserve
 Tiwai Rocks Wildlife Management Reserve

References

Protected areas of New Zealand
Lists of tourist attractions in New Zealand
New Zealand environment-related lists